The Large Münsterländer (or Großer Münsterländer) is a breed of gun dog originally from the Münster region in Germany.

The first breed club was founded in Germany in 1919 and the breed was recognised by the Kennel Club (UK) in 1971.

The breed is an offshoot of the German Longhaired Pointer, and was officially recognized as a separate breed when the German Longhaired Pointer club chose to deny recognition to the black and white color variation.

The breed can also be a great family dog/pet. 

They are very Loyal.

Appearance

The standard is set by FCI and the translation was done by Mrs. Peggy Davis from the original German.

The Large Munsterlander should be athletic, intelligent, noble, and elegant in appearance. Its body should be the same length as its height at the withers. The dog should be muscular without being bulky. Its gait should be fluid and elastic.

Size
Large Munsterlanders should be  at the withers for males,  for females.

Coat and colour
The coat is black and white with hair of medium length. Due to the nature of the piebald gene, the amount of black in an individual's coat pattern is highly variable, ranging from predominantly white to predominantly black. Markings occur as solid black patches, with black ticking or roan filling in the white fur in varying degrees of concentration. Usually, the head is predominantly black and the tip of the tail is white, regardless of the distribution of black and white, and roan and ticking on the rest of the body.

The Large Munsterlander was included in a genetic research study and all were homozygous for the sp allele in the MITF gene that causes piebald spotting.

It was also included in several other coat color studies and the data summarized on a webpage entitled "Large Munsterlander Coat Color Genetics".

The coat is dense, but should be firm and sleek.

History

The Large Munsterlander is one of several continental breeds of versatile hunting dogs. They are also a HPR (Hunt, Point and Retrieve) Gundog. Although the breed is one of the last of the German breeds to gain official representation by a separate breed club, the Large Munsterlander was recognised as a colour variant of the German Longhaired Pointer prior to that time. The breed first gained official recognition in the Munsterland of northwestern Germany in the early 1900s. However, the forerunner of the modern Large Munsterlander can be recognised in artist's representations of hunting scenes as far back as the Middle Ages.

The Large Munsterlander was introduced to North America by Kurt von Kleist in 1966.  The Large Munsterlander Club of North America® was founded in 1977.

Field ability
This field dog characteristically is calm and gentle with children and well adjusted to living in the master's dwelling. The versatile characteristics of the breed provide for a reliable companion for all facets of hunting.

A recent comparison of the scores of 82 Large Munsterlanders with 104 other versatile breeds entered in the North American Versatile Hunting Dog Association (NAVHDA) tests showed that the Large Munsterlander is a versatile dog with a difference.

On average, Large Munsterlanders work closer and are more responsive to the handler than other breeds, although the Large Munsterlander's pointing instinct matures later. The breed displayed greater cooperation than other breeds and an excellent concentration in the tracking and recovery of crippled game birds. During search for game, most dogs range , depending on cover.

Their long and thick coat protects them against cold and allows them to search dense cover thoroughly, but as a result leaves them more susceptible to burrs.

See also

 Dogs portal
 List of dog breeds

References

External links 
 

Dog breeds originating in Germany
FCI breeds
Rare dog breeds
Gundogs
Pointers